Szolem Mandelbrojt (10 January 1899 – 23 September 1983) was a Polish-French mathematician who specialized in mathematical analysis. He was a professor at the Collège de France from 1938 to 1972, where he held the Chair of Analytical Mechanics and Celestial Mechanics.

Biography 

Szolem Mandelbrojt was born on 10 January 1899 in Warsaw, Poland into a Jewish family of Lithuanian descent. He was initially educated in Warsaw, then in 1919 he moved to Kharkov, Ukraine (then USSR) and spent a year as a student of the Russian mathematician Sergei Bernstein. A year later,  he emigrated to France and settled in Paris. In subsequent years, he attended the seminars of Jacques Hadamard, Henri Lebesgue, Émile Picard, and others. In 1923, he received a doctorate from Paris-Sorbonne University on the analytic continuation of the Taylor series. Hadamard was his Ph.D. advisor.

In 1924 Mandelbrojt was awarded a Rockefeller Fellowship in the United States.
In May 1926 he married Gladys Manuelle Grunwald (born 28 June 1904 in Paris).
From 1926 to 1927, he spent a year as an assistant professor at the Rice Institute (now Rice University) in Houston, Texas.

In 1928 he returned to France - having received French citizenship in 1927 – and was appointed an assistant professor at the University of Lille. The following year he became a full professor at the University of Clermont-Ferrand. In December 1934 Mandelbrojt co-founded the Nicolas Bourbaki group of mathematicians, of which he was a member until World War II. He succeeded Hadamard at Collège de France in 1938 and took up the Chair of Analytical Mechanics and Celestial Mechanics.

Mandelbrojt helped several members of his family emigrate from Poland to France in 1936. One of them, his nephew Benoit Mandelbrot, was to discover the Mandelbrot set and coin the word fractal in the 1970s.

In 1939 he fought for France when the country was invaded by the Nazis, then in 1940, along with many scientists helped by Louis Rapkine and the Rockefeller Foundation, Mandelbrojt relocated to the United States, taking up a position at the Rice Institute. In 1944 he joined the scientific committee of the Free French Forces in London, England.

In 1945 Mandelbrojt moved back to France and resumed his professional activities at Collège de France, where he remained until his retirement in 1972. In his retirement year he was elected a member of the French Academy of Sciences.

Szolem Mandelbrojt died at the age of 84 in Paris, France, on 23 September 1983.

Research 

Even though Mandelbrojt was an early member of the Bourbaki group, and he did take part in a number of Bourbaki gatherings until the breakout of the war, his main research interests were actually quite remote from abstract algebra. As evidenced by his publications (see next), he focused on complex analysis and harmonic analysis, with an emphasis on Dirichlet series, lacunary series, and entire functions.

Rather than a Bourbakist, he is perhaps more accurately described as a follower of G. H. Hardy. Together with Norbert Wiener and Torsten Carleman, he can be viewed as a moderate modernizer of classical Fourier analysis.

Shmuel Agmon, Jean-Pierre Kahane, Yitzhak Katznelson, and Paul Malliavin are among his students.

Selected works

Books

Lecture notes

Articles

Thesis

Notes

References

External links
 
 .
 Szolem Mandelbrojt at Collège de France.
 Szolem Mandelbrojt at Hathi Trust Digital Library.

1899 births
1983 deaths
National University of Kharkiv alumni
Nicolas Bourbaki
20th-century French mathematicians
Polish mathematicians
Jewish scientists
Academic staff of the Lille University of Science and Technology
Members of the French Academy of Sciences
Rice University faculty
20th-century Polish Jews
Polish emigrants to France